Excelsior Rotterdam is a Dutch women's football team from Rotterdam which competes in the Vrouwen Eredivisie, the top women's league in the Netherlands.

Established in 2017 as a result of a three seasons partnership between professional club Excelsior Rotterdam and amateur club BVV Barendrecht to create a women's team from the Rotterdam area. The team uses Barendrecht training facilities and host its matches at either Excelsior's Van Donge & De Roo Stadion or Barendrecht's Sportpark De Bongerd.

Seasons

a = season abandoned due to Covid

Current squad

Former players

Head coaches
 Sander Luiten (2017–2018)
 Richard Mank (2018–)

Broadcasting
As of the 2020–21 season, league matches played on Sunday are broadcast on ESPN. Public service broadcaster NOS occasionally broadcasts some Sunday games live and provides game highlights during the Studio Sport programme.

References

External links
 Official site 

Women
Excelsior
Excelsior
Excelsior
2017 establishments in the Netherlands
Association football clubs established in 2017